The 1938 Oregon gubernatorial election took place on November 8, 1938. In the election for governor of Oregon, Republican nominee Charles A. Sprague defeated Democratic nominee Henry L. Hess. Incumbent governor Charles Martin lost in the Democratic primary to Hess, an attorney and former state senator from La Grande. Hess was a strong supporter of President Franklin Delano Roosevelt's New Deal while Martin was a frequent critic of the program.

Background
Incumbent Democratic governor Charles Martin had been elected in the middle of the Great Depression in the 1934 governor's race. A conservative Democrat, Martin appealed to many business-minded Republicans, and his administration focused on strengthening state finances, even opposing restoring state workers to full pay as the Depression eased. Martin vigorously opposed many aspects of President Roosevelt's New Deal, in particular parts dealing with unions and labor, such as the formation of the National Labor Relations Board.

Campaign
When Martin announced his intention to run for the Democratic nomination for another term, labor unions and the Roosevelt administration sought an alternative, eventually throwing their weight behind Henry L. Hess, a little-known attorney and former state senator from Union County. Harold L. Ickes, Roosevelt's Secretary of the Interior and a key implementer of New Deal policies, indicated his support for Hess, though Roosevelt himself stayed officially neutral.

In a hard-fought Democratic primary, Hess won 49% of the vote to Martin's 44%, with labor strongholds in Portland and the timber counties supporting Hess and agricultural regions behind Martin. A third candidate, O. Henry Oleen, a state representative from St. Helens, earned about 7% of the vote.

With most of the attention on the Democratic primary, on the Republican side, newspaper publisher Charles A. Sprague emerged from a crowded seven-way Republican field with a comfortable plurality of 48% of the vote, 30 percentage points better than his nearest competitor, former state senator Sam Brown.

In the general election, the Republican establishment, which had supported Martin, now threw their support to Sprague, who cruised to an easy victory.

Election results

References

Gubernatorial
1938
Oregon
November 1938 events